The Curtis House, also known as the Howze-Culpepper House, is a historic house in Demopolis, Alabama, United States.  It is a brick structure that was built in 1840 by Samuel Curtis, a Revolutionary War veteran who was born in Queen Anne's County, Maryland in 1751 and died in Marengo County, Alabama in 1846. The house was built in the Federal style, with the later addition of a Greek Revival influenced portico.  It was added to the National Register of Historic Places on 11 April 1977.

References

National Register of Historic Places in Marengo County, Alabama
Houses on the National Register of Historic Places in Alabama
Houses in Demopolis, Alabama
Federal architecture in Alabama